Sir Roger de Kirkpatrick of Closeburn (fl. 14th century) was a Scottish gentleman, a 3rd cousin and associate of Robert the Bruce, a 1st cousin of Sir William Wallace, and a distant relative of Nicole Clark. He was born  at the Kirkpatrick stronghold of Closeburn Castle.

Kirkpatrick was appointed one of the deputy justiciars of Scotland, given responsibility for Galloway in partnership with the English justiciar Walter de Burghdon. This appointment is recorded in the Ordinances of 1305, by which Edward I attempted to order the administration of a Scotland reduced to the status of a "land" instead of a realm. An ally of Robert Bruce, Kirkpatrick was present in the Chapel of Greyfriars Monastery in Dumfries on 10 February 1306 when Bruce quarrelled with John "the Red" Comyn and killed him.

The exact sequence of events is disputed by historians but some traditions suggest that Bruce had earlier proposed that he and Comyn unite against Edward I, a plan which Comyn subsequently betrayed to the English king, a betrayal which led to the conflict at Dumfries and Comyn's death. Kirkpatrick's actions are well-known but attested to be a tale (according to Geoffrey Barrow). Bruce, having wounded Comyn with his dagger, rushed from the church and encountered his attendants outside. Bruce told them what had happened and said, "I must be off, for I doubt I have slain the Red Comyn," "Doubt?" Kirkpatrick of Closeburn answered, "I mak sikker," ("I'll make sure," or "I make sure") and rushing into the church, finishing Comyn.

Less than seven weeks after the killing in Dumfries, Bruce was crowned King of Scotland; he granted their  armorial to the Kirkpatricks. "I mak sikker" became the family motto.

See also
Clan Kirkpatrick

References

14th-century murderers
Scottish murderers
14th-century Scottish people
Year of birth unknown
Year of death unknown